Dash Alti (also Romanized as Dāsh Āltī) is a village in Nazarkahrizi Rural District, Nazarkahrizi District, Hashtrud County, East Azerbaijan Province, Iran. At the 2006 census, its population was 53, in 15 families.

References 

Towns and villages in Hashtrud County